This is a List of Canada Cup Winners. The Canada Cup is an annual floorball open event, with over 60 teams competing in 8 different divisions.

See also
Canada Cup (floorball)
Czech Open (floorball)
List of Czech Open winners

External links
Official Canada Cup Website

Floorball in Canada
Floorball competitions